The Portuguese Inquisition (Portuguese: Inquisição Portuguesa), officially known as the General Council of the Holy Office of the Inquisition in Portugal, was formally established in Portugal in 1536 at the request of its king, John III. Although Manuel I had asked for the installation of the Inquisition in 1515 to fulfill the commitment of his marriage with Maria of Aragon, it was only after his death that Pope Paul III acquiesced. In the period after the Medieval Inquisition, it was one of three different manifestations of the wider Christian Inquisition, along with the Spanish Inquisition and Roman Inquisition. The Goa Inquisition was an extension of the Portuguese Inquisition in colonial-era Portuguese India.

History
The major target of the Portuguese Inquisition were those who had converted from Judaism to Catholicism, the Conversos (also known as New Christians or Marranos), who were suspected of secretly practicing Judaism. Many of these were originally Spanish Jews who had left Spain for Portugal, when Spain forced Jews to convert to Christianity or leave. The number of victims is estimated as around 40,000. To a lesser extent people of other ethnicities and faiths, such as African practitioners of diasporic African religions and Vodun smuggled through the Atlantic slave trade from the colonies and territories of the Portuguese Empire, were put on trial and imprisoned with the accusations of heresy and witchcraft by the Portuguese Inquisition.

As in Spain, the Inquisition was subject to the authority of the King, although the Portuguese Inquisition in practice exercised a considerable degree of institutional independence from both the Crown and the papacy compared to its Spanish counterpart. It was headed by a Grand Inquisitor, or General Inquisitor, named by the Pope but selected by the king, always from within the royal family. The Grand Inquisitor would later nominate other inquisitors. In Portugal, the first Grand Inquisitor was D. Diogo da Silva, personal confessor of King John III and Bishop of Ceuta. He was followed by Cardinal Henry, brother of John III, who would later become king. There were Courts of the Inquisition in Lisbon, Coimbra, and Évora, and for a short time (1541 until c. 1547) also in Porto, Tomar, and Lamego.

It held its first auto-da-fé in Portugal in 1540. Like the Spanish Inquisition, it concentrated its efforts on rooting out those who had converted from other faiths (overwhelmingly Judaism) but did not adhere to the strictures of Catholic orthodoxy.

The Portuguese Inquisition expanded its scope of operations from  Portugal to Portugal's colonial possessions, including Brazil, Cape Verde, and Goa in India, where it continued investigating and trying cases based on supposed breaches of orthodox Roman Catholicism until 1821.

Under John III, the activity of the courts was extended to the censure of books, as well as undertaking cases of divination, witchcraft, and bigamy. Originally aimed at religious matters, the Inquisition had an influence on almost every aspect of Portuguese life – political, cultural, and social.

Many New Christians from Portugal migrated to Goa in the 1500s as a result of the inquisition in Portugal. They were Crypto-Jews and Crypto-Muslims, falsely-converted Jews and Muslims who were secretly practising their old religions. Both were considered a security threat to the Portuguese, because Jews had an established reputation in Iberia for joining forces with Muslims to overthrow Christian rulers. The Jesuit missionary Francis Xavier requested that the Goa Inquisition be set up in a letter dated 16 May 1546 to King John III of Portugal, in order to deal with false converts to Catholicism. The Inquisition began in Goa in 1560. Of the 1,582 persons convicted between 1560 and 1623, 45.2% were convicted for offenses related to Judaism and Islam.

The Goa Inquisition also turned its attention to falsely-converted and non-convert Hindus. It prosecuted non-convert Hindus who broke prohibitions against the public observance of Hindu rites, and those non-convert Hindus who interfered with sincere converts to Catholicism. A compilation of the auto-da-fé statistics of the Goa Inquisition from its beginning 1560 till its end in 1821 reveal that a total of 57 persons were burnt in the flesh and 64 in effigy (i.e. a statue resembling the person). All the burnt were convicted as relapsed heretics or for sodomy.

Among the main targets of the Inquisition were also the Portuguese Christian traditions and movements that were not perceived as orthodox. The millenarian and national Feast of the Cult of the Empire of the Holy Spirit, dating from the mid 13th century, spread throughout all mainland Portugal from then into the 14th century. In the following centuries it spread throughout Portugal's Atlantic islands and empire, where it was the main target of prohibition and surveillance by the Inquisition after the 1540s, since it had almost disappeared from continental Portugal and India. This spiritual tradition, practiced exclusively by non-religious officials and popular Brotherhoods in the Middle Ages and following centuries, was gradually restored only after the second half of the 20th century in some municipalities of mainland Portugal. By then, except for a few faithful and accurate local traditions, it had undergone major deletions and changes (in what remained or was restored) of the ancient rituals.   

According to the traditional Feast of the Empire of the Holy Spirit, celebrated at the feast of Pentecost, a future, third age would be governed by the Empire of Holy Spirit and would represent a monastic or fraternal governance, in which the hierarchy of the Catholic Church, the intermediaries, and the organized Churches would be unnecessary, and infidels would unite with Christians by free will. Until the 16th century, this was the main annual festivity in most of the major Portuguese cities, with multiple celebrations in Lisbon (with 8), Porto (4), and Coimbra (3). The Church and the Inquisition would not tolerate a spiritual tradition entirely popular and without the mediation of the clergy at the time, and most importantly, celebrating a future Age which would bring an end to the Church.

The cult of the Holy Spirit survived in the Azores Islands among the local population and under the traditional protection of the Order of Christ. Here the arm of the Inquisition did not effectively extend its power, despite reports from local ecclesiastical authorities. Beyond the Azores, the cult survived in many parts of Brazil (where it was established in the 16th through 18th centuries) and is celebrated today in all Brazilian states except two, as well as in pockets of Portuguese settlers in North America (Canada and USA), mainly among those of Azorean descent. Afro-Brazilian religious mystic and formerly enslaved prostitute, Rosa Egipcíaca, was imprisoned in both Rio de Janeiro and Lisbon by the Inquisition. She died working in the kitchen of the Lisbon inquisition. Egipcíaca was the author of the first book to be written by a black woman in Brazil - entitled Sagrada Teologia do Amor Divino das Almas Peregrinas it detailed her religious visions and prophecies.

The movements and concepts of Sebastianism and of the Fifth Empire were sometimes also targets of the Inquisition (the most intense persecution of Sebastianists being during the Philippine Dynasty, though it lasted beyond then), both considered unorthodox and even heretical. But targeting was intermittent and selective since some important familiares (associated people) of the Holy Office (Inquisition) were Sebastianists.

The financial problems of King Sebastian in 1577 led him, in exchange for a large sum of money, to allow the free departure of New Christians, and to ban the confiscation of property by the Inquisition for 10 years.

King John IV, in 1649, banned the confiscation of property by the Inquisition and was excommunicated immediately by Rome. This law was only fully withdrawn around 1656, with the death of the king.

From 1674 to 1681 the Inquisition was suspended in Portugal: autos-da-fé were suspended and inquisitors were instructed not to inflict sentences of relaxation, confiscation, or perpetual galleys. This was an action of António Vieira in Rome to put an end to the Inquisition in Portugal and its Empire. Vieira had earned the name of the Apostle of Brazil. At the request of the pope he drew up a report of two hundred pages on the Inquisition in Portugal, with the result that after a judicial inquiry Pope Innocent XI himself suspended it for five years (1676–81).

António Vieira had long regarded the New Christians with compassion and had urged King John IV, with whom he had much influence and support, not only to abolish confiscation but to remove the distinctions between them and the Old Christians. He had made enemies and the Inquisition readily undertook his punishment. His writings in favor of the oppressed were condemned as "rash, scandalous, erroneous, savoring of heresy, and well adapted to pervert the ignorant." After three years of incarceration, he was penanced in the audience-chamber of Coimbra on 23 December 1667. His sympathy for the victims of the Holy Office was sharpened by his experience of its "unwholesome prisons", where he wrote that "five unfortunates were not uncommonly placed in a cell nine feet by eleven, where the only light came from a narrow opening near the ceiling, where the vessels were changed only once a week, and all spiritual consolation was denied." Then, in the safe refuge of Rome, he raised his voice for the relief of the oppressed, in numerous writings in which he characterized the "Holy Office of Portugal as a tribunal which served only to deprive men of their fortunes, their honor, and their lives, while unable to discriminate between guilt and innocence; it was known to be holy only in name, while its works were cruelty and injustice, unworthy of rational beings, although it was always proclaiming its superior piety."

In 1773 and 1774 Pombaline Reforms abolished autos-da-fé and ended the Limpeza de Sangue (blood cleansing) statutes and their discrimination against New Christians, the Jews and all their descendants who had converted to Christianity in order to escape the Portuguese Inquisition.

The Portuguese inquisition was terminated in 1821 by the "General Extraordinary and Constituent Assembly of the Portuguese Nation."

In 2007, the Portuguese Government initiated a project to make available online by 2010 a significant part of the archives of the Portuguese Inquisition currently deposited in the Arquivo Nacional da Torre do Tombo, the Portuguese National Archives.

In December 2008, the Jewish Historical Society of England (JHSE) published the Lists of the Portuguese Inquisition in two volumes:  Volume I Lisbon 1540–1778; Volume II Évora 1542–1763 and Goa 1650–1653. The original manuscripts, assembled in 1784 and entitled Collecção das Noticias, were once in the Library of the Dukes of Palmela and are now in the library of the Jewish Theological Seminary in New York. The texts are published in the original Portuguese, transcribed and indexed by Joy L. Oakley. They represent a unique picture of the whole range of the Inquisition's activities and a primary source for Jewish, Portuguese, and Brazilian historians and genealogists.

Table of sentences
The archives of the Portuguese Inquisition are one of the best preserved judicial archives of early modern Europe. Portuguese historian Fortunato de Almeida gives the following statistics of sentences pronounced in the public ceremonies autos da fe between 1536 and 1794:

The original documentation of the Portuguese Inquisition tribunals is preserved in Lisbon. A list of autos da fé in Goa presented by Almeida was compiled by the officials of the Inquisition in 1774, and a copy of the full records have been found in the Lisbon archives. Some minor gaps concern the tribunals, i.e., there is no usable data about some fifteen autos da fé celebrated in Portugal between 1580 and 1640, while the records of short-lived tribunals in Lamego and Porto (both active from 1541 until c. 1547) are yet to be studied.

See also
 Goa Inquisition
 New Christians
 Converso
 Marrano
 Crypto-Jew
 Anusim
 Sebastião de Melo, Marquis of Pombal

Notes

Further reading

Aufderheide, Patricia. "True Confessions: The Inquisition and Social Attitudes in Brazil at the Turn of the XVII Century." Luso-Brazilian Review 10.2 (1973): 208-240.
Beinart, Haim. "The Conversos in Spain and Portugal in the 16th to 18th Centuries." In Moreshet Sepharad: The Sephardi Legacy, 2 vols., edited by Haim Beinart, II.43-67. Jerusalem: The Magnes Press, 1992.
dos Santos, Maria Cristina. "Betrayal: A Jesuit in the service of Dutch Brazil processed by the Inquisition." (2009): 239-245.
Higgs, David. "The Inquisition in Brazil in the 1790s." communication du séminaire Late Colonial Brazil, University of Toronto (1986).
Higgs, David. "Tales of two Carmelites: inquisitorial narratives from Portugal and Brazil." Infamous desire: male homosexuality in colonial Latin America (2003): 152-167.
Jobim, L.C. "An 18th-century denunciation of the Inquisition in Brazil." Estudios Ibero-americanos 13.2 (1987) pp. 195-213.
Marcocci, Giuseppe. "Toward a History of the Portuguese Inquisition Trends in Modern Historiography (1974-2009)." Revue de l'histoire des religions 227.3 (2010): 355-393.
Mocatta, Frederic David. The Jews of Spain and Portugal and the Inquisition. London: Longmans, Green, and Co., 1877.
Mott, Luiz. "Crypto-sodomites in colonial Brazil." Pelo Vaso Traseiro: Sodomy and Sodomites in Luso-Brazilian History (Tucson: Fenestra Books, 2007a) (2003): 168-96.
Myscofski, Carole. "Heterodoxy, Gender, and the Brazilian Inquisition: Patterns in Religion in the 1590s." (1992).
Novinsky, Anita. "Marranos and the Inquisition: On the Gold Route in Minas Gerais, Brazil." The Jews and the Expansion of Europe to the West 1400 (2001): 1800.
Novinsky, Anita. "Padre Antonio Vieira, the inquisition, and the Jews." Hîstôry¯ a yêhûdît= Jewish history 6.1-2 (1992): 151-162.
Paiva, José P. "Philip IV of Spain and the Portuguese Inquisition (1621–1641)." Journal of Religious History (2016).
Pieroni, Gedaldo. "Outcasts from the kingdom: the Inquisition and the banishment of New Christians to Brazil." The Jews and the expansion of Europe to the west, 1450-1800 (2000): 242-251.
Pulido Serrano, Juan Ignacio. "Converso Complicities in an Atlantic Monarchy: Political and Social Conflicts behind the Inquisitorial Persecutions." In The Conversos and Moriscos in Late Medieval Spain and Beyond, Volume Three: Displaced Persons, edited by Kevin Ingram and Juan Ignacio Pulido Serrano, 117-128. Leiden: Brill, 2015.
---. "Plural Identities: The Portuguese New Christians." Jewish History 25 (2011): 129-151.
Ray, Jonathan. After Expulsion: 1492 and the Making of Sephardic Jewry. New York: New York University Press, 2013.
Roth, Norman. Conversos, Inquisition, and the Expulsion of the Jews from Spain [1995]. 2nd ed. Madison: University of Wisconsin Press, 2002.
Rowland, Robert. "New Christian, Marrano, Jew." In The Jews and the Expansion of Europe to the West, 1450-1800, edited by Paolo Bernardini and Norman Fiering, 125-148. New York: Berghahn Books, 2001.
Santos, Vanicléia Silva. "Africans, Afro-Brazilians and Afro-Portuguese in the Iberian Inquisition in the seventeenth and eighteenth centuries." African and Black Diaspora 5.1 (2012): 49-63.
Saraiva, José António. The Marrano Factory: The Portuguese Inquisition and Its New Christians [1956], translated by H.P. Salomon and I.S.D. Sassoon. Leiden: Brill, 2001.
Schwartz, Stuart B. "Luso-Spanish Relations in Hapsburg Brazil, 1580–1640." The Americas 25.01 (1968): 33-48.
Schwartz, Stuart B. "Inquisition, catalog of the accused-Sources for a history of Brazil, 18th century (Portuguese)-Novinsky, A." (1996): 114-134.
Siebenhüner, Kim. "Inquisitions." Translated by Heidi Bek. In Judging Faith, Punishing Sin: Inquisitions and Consistories in the Early Modern World, edited by Charles H. Parker and Gretchen Starr-LeBeau, 140-152. Cambridge: Cambridge University Press, 2017.
Soyer, François. The Persecution of the Jews and Muslims of Portugal: King Manuel I and the End of Religious Tolerance (1496-7). Leiden: Brill, 2007.
Stols, Eddy. "Dutch and Flemish Victims of the Inquisition in Brazil." Essays on Cultural Identity in Colonial Latin America: 43-62.
Wadsworth, James E. "In the name of the Inquisition: the Portuguese Inquisition and delegated authority in colonial Pernambuco, Brazil." The Americas 61.1 (2004): 19-54.
Wadsworth, James E. "Jurema and Batuque: Indians, africans, and the inquisition in colonial northeastern Brazil." History of religions 46.2 (2006): 140-162.
Wadsworth, James E. "Children of the Inquisition: Minors as Familiares of the Inquisition in Pernambuco, Brazil, 1613–1821." Luso-Brazilian Review 42.1 (2005): 21-43.
Wadsworth, James E. Agents of orthodoxy: honor, status, and the Inquisition in colonial Pernambuco, Brazil. Rowman & Littlefield Publishers, 2006.
Walker, Timothy. "Sorcerers and folkhealers: africans and the Inquisition in Portugal (1680-1800)." (2004).
Wiznitzer, Arnold. Jews in Colonial Brazil. New York: Columbia University Press, 1960.
Wiznitzer, Arnold. "The Jews in the Sugar Industry of Colonial Brazil." Jewish Social Studies (1956): 189-198.

References
Alexandre Herculano, História da Origem e Estabelecimento da Inquisição em Portugal (translation of 1926).
 Text of "History Of The Origin And Establishment Of The Inquisition In Portugal" by Alexandre Herculano
 Poettering, Jorun,  Migrating Merchants. Trade, Nation, and Religion in Seventeenth-Century Hamburg and Portugal'', Berlin, De Gruyter Oldenbourg, 2019.

External links 
 Index of the court proceedings and other documents of the Portuguese Inquisition (in Portuguese)
Lists of the Portuguese Inquisition, in two volumes:  Volume I Lisbon 1540-1778; Volume II Evora 1542-1763 and Goa 1650-1653.
JHSE Publications

 
1536 establishments in Portugal
1821 disestablishments
Early Modern Christian anti-Judaism
History of Catholicism in Portugal
History of the conversos
Jewish Brazilian history
Jewish Portuguese history
Judaism in Portugal
Sephardi Jews topics
Jewish Cape Verdean history